R. Scott Stephenson is an American historian and museum professional who has served as President and CEO of the Museum of the American Revolution in Philadelphia since 2018. Stephenson previously served as the Museum's first director of collections and interpretation from 2007-2018, during which time he oversaw the development of the Museum's award-winning exhibitions, multimedia experiences, and educational programs as well the Museum's collection. Stephenson was on the team that raised $173 million to build and open the Museum, surpassing the $150 million campaign goal. Prior to that, he developed and collaborated on exhibits, films, and interpretive programs for a number of historical institutions including Colonial Williamsburg and the Smithsonian.

Education
Stephenson holds an M.A. and Ph.D. in American History from the University of Virginia. He is a specialist in colonial and revolutionary American history and material culture with a background in visual storytelling. He received his bachelor's degree from Juniata College.

Exhibits and media appearances

Stephenson oversaw the creation of a traveling exhibit called “Clash of Empires” at the Heinz History Center to mark the 250th anniversary of the French and Indian War. In 2006, he consulted on a four-hour PBS miniseries called “The War that Made America,” which dealt with the American Revolution. He served as a consultant on The Last of the Mohicans (1992), Hostages of Two Worlds (2001), and Washington: Man and Myth (1999). Stephenson has appeared as himself on episodes of the Emmy-award winning genealogy show Who Do You Think You Are?.. He has appeared on numerous C-SPAN programs. In June 2019, he was interviewed in a segment about the Museum on CBS News about telling a more inclusive, nuanced version of the American Revolution. In 2017, Stephenson was part of the team, with Philip Mead, that discovered the only known period image of General George Washington's Revolutionary War tent in the field.

Personal life
Stephenson is married to child neurologist Donna Stephenson. They have two children and live in Chester County, Pennsylvania.

References

External links 
 

Year of birth missing (living people)
Living people
American curators
21st-century American historians
People from Chester County, Pennsylvania
Historians of Colonial North America
Historians from Pennsylvania
University of Virginia alumni
Historians of the American Revolution
Juniata College alumni